Mercury-Jupiter was a proposed suborbital launch configuration consisting of a Jupiter missile carrying a Mercury capsule. Two flights were planned in support of Project Mercury. On July 1, 1959, less than a year after the October, 1958 program start date, the flights were canceled due to budget constraints. The MJ-1 flight would have been a heat shield test. The MJ-2 flight was planned as a maximum dynamic pressure qualification test of the production Mercury spacecraft with a chimpanzee on board.

See also
List of space launch system designs

References

Project Mercury
Cancelled space launch vehicles